Houet is one of the 45 provinces of Burkina Faso, located in its Hauts-Bassins Region. The capital of Houet is Bobo-Dioulasso. In 2019, the province had a population of 1,509,377.

Departments
Houet is divided into 13 departments (one of them, Bobo-Dioulasso is further subdivided in arrondissements) :

See also
Regions of Burkina Faso
Provinces of Burkina Faso
Departments of Burkina Faso

References

 
Provinces of Burkina Faso